Poulomi Das is an Indian model and television actress. She is known for portraying the role of Baby on Star Plus's soap opera Suhani Si Ek Ladki and Purnima on Kartik Purnima that aired on Star Bharat.

Career
Das starting her modeling career two years ago and in early 2016 she appeared in the second installment of India's Next Top Model as a contestant where she was selected as a finalist. In November 2016, it was announced that she has been cast on "Suhani Si Ek Ladki" as a character called Baby. after that she has been cast on Dil Hi Toh Hai as a female parallel lead character called Ananya Puri produce by Balaji Telefilms in July 2018, June 2018 she was on Maxim cover as popular personality. In 2020, she bagged the lead role of Purnima in Star Bharat's soap opera "Kartik Purnima".

She worked in a web series titled Paraushpur on an OTT platform Alt Balaji as Kala in December 2020

Filmography

Television

References

Year of birth missing (living people)
Living people
Indian female models
Indian soap opera actresses
St. Paul's Cathedral Mission College alumni